Zimbabwean Bonds are a form of legal tender near money released by the Reserve Bank of Zimbabwe which attempts to resolve Zimbabwe's lack of currency. Bonds are pegged against the U.S. dollar at a 1:1 fixed exchange rate and backed by the country's reserve. Since abandoning the Zimbabwean dollar in 2009 after it went into hyperinflation the country began using a number of foreign currencies including the U.S. dollar, South African rand, British pound and Chinese yuan as a means of exchange. The inability to print these currencies led to a shortage of money with banks issuing limits on withdrawals.

Coins

On 18 December 2014 the Reserve Bank of Zimbabwe began issuing so-called 'bond coins' which were supported by a US$50 million facility extended to the Reserve Bank of Zimbabwe by Afreximbank (the African Export–Import Bank). Pegged against the U.S. dollar coins were denominated at 1, 5, 10, and 25 cents and later followed by a 50-cent coin in 2015. A bi-metallic one-dollar bond coin was released on 28 November 2016.

Notes

In November 2016 backed by a US$200 million Afreximbank loan the Reserve Bank of Zimbabwe began issuing $2 bond notes. Two months later US$15 million worth of new $5 bond notes were also released. Further plans for $10 and $20 bond notes were ruled out by the central bank's governor, John Mangudya.

References

Currencies of Zimbabwe
Economy of Zimbabwe